Pape-Philippe Amagou (born February 27, 1985) is a French-born Ivorian retired basketball player. During his career, he played for several teams in France and Greece and was a member of the Côte d'Ivoire national basketball team. He is a four-time Pro A champion.

Professional career
In 2005–06 season, Amagou became a French national basketball champion with his team Le Mans Sarthe after previously capturing the French National Cup in 2004.
Amagou also participated in the French All-Star Game in 2005 and 2006. He was an early entry candidate in the 2006 NBA draft but was not selected.

Amagou played with Kavala of the Greek League in the 2008–09 season. He averaged 8.0 points and 2.2 assists per game. From 2009 to 2012, he played with Chorale Roanne. In August 2011, he signed one-year deal with SLUC Nancy. In 2012, he returned to Chorale Roanne and stayed with them for two seasons.

In June 2014, he signed a two-year deal with Limoges CSP. In July 2015, he left Limoges and signed a three-year deal with his first-team Le Mans Sarthe.

National team career
Amagou was a member of the Côte d'Ivoire team that finished second at the 2009 FIBA Africa Championship. He was named to the All-Tournament First Team after he finished with 11.4 PPG and 2.4 APG.

References

External links
 Eurobasket.com profile 
 FIBA.com profile

1985 births
Living people
2010 FIBA World Championship players
Chorale Roanne Basket players
French men's basketball players
French sportspeople of Ivorian descent
Citizens of Ivory Coast through descent
Ivorian expatriates in Greece
Ivorian men's basketball players
Kavala B.C. players
Le Mans Sarthe Basket players
Limoges CSP players
People from Maisons-Laffitte
Point guards
SLUC Nancy Basket players
Sportspeople from Yvelines